Mika Natif is an Israeli-born American scholar of art history specializing in art of the Islamic World, especially Mongol art. Dr. Natif currently serves as an assistant professor in Art History at the George Washington University. She has previously held a post-doctorate at the College of the Holy Cross and did curatorial work at the Harvard Art Museums on Islamic and Later Indian Art. Dr. Natif is a co-editor of Eros and Sexuality in Islamic Art.

References

Living people
American people of Israeli descent
George Washington University faculty
Year of birth missing (living people)
American art historians
Women art historians